Llewellyn Strange (1892–1973) was a police chief and politician in Newfoundland. He represented Port de Grave from 1956 to 1962 in the Newfoundland House of Assembly.

The son of John and Jane E. Strange, he was born in Port de Grave and was educated there. Strange married Mary Ellen Morgan. He worked in the fishery and then, in 1921, joined the Newfoundland constabulary. Strange worked in the criminal investigation division from 1926 until 1933, when he became head constable. In 1934, he became assistant chief of police and a justice of the peace. In January 1945, he was named commanding officer for the Constabulary. He retired in 1956.

Strange was first elected to the Newfoundland assembly in 1956 and was reelected in 1959. He retired from politics in 1962, moving back to Port de Grave.

References 

1892 births
1973 deaths
Liberal Party of Newfoundland and Labrador MHAs
Dominion of Newfoundland people